Hipólito Fernández Serrano (born 20 March 1977), known as Poli, is a Spanish retired footballer who played as a left back.

He played 191 games in La Liga over eight seasons, mainly with Mallorca and Recreativo (three years apiece). He added 157 matches and four goals in Segunda División.

Club career
Poli was born in Seville, Andalusia. After making his professional debut with CF Extremadura in Segunda División he moved in 2002, alongside teammate David Cortés, to RCD Mallorca, where they were the starting fullbacks during three La Liga seasons.

In 2005–06, Poli signed for fellow league club Deportivo Alavés, with little individual and team success (nine matches out of 38 for the player, relegation). In the following campaign he joined Recreativo de Huelva, freshly promoted to the top level.

With Recre, Poli was used mostly as a backup, although he started in the vast majority of his appearances, helping them to three consecutive top flight seasons, with relegation befalling in 2009. Subsequently, he featured sparingly due to injury problems, retiring in June 2011 at the age of 34 – he only played in two league games in his last year.

Honours
Mallorca
Copa del Rey: 2002–03

References

External links

1977 births
Living people
Footballers from Seville
Spanish footballers
Association football defenders
La Liga players
Segunda División players
Segunda División B players
Betis Deportivo Balompié footballers
CF Extremadura footballers
RCD Mallorca players
Deportivo Alavés players
Recreativo de Huelva players